John Harold McLaughlin (March 26, 1905 – December 8, 1991) was a provincial level politician from Alberta, Canada. He served as a member of the Legislative Assembly of Alberta from 1955 to 1959 sitting with the opposition Liberal caucus.

Political career
McLaughlin ran for a seat to the Alberta Legislature in the electoral district of Stony Plain in the 1955 Alberta general election. He won the district defeating incumbent Cornelia Wood on a surge of support that would see the Liberal vote improve by almost 30% from the previous election.

McLaughlin stood for a second term in the 1959 Alberta general election. He would again face Wood who would win her seat back after McLaughlin lost a significant share of his 1955 vote. The two would face each other for the third time in the 1963 Alberta general election. Wood kept her seat as they both lost 4% of their popular vote coming in first and second respectively in the five way race.

References

External links
Legislative Assembly of Alberta Members Listing

1905 births
1991 deaths
Alberta Liberal Party MLAs
Politicians from Edmonton